"Are You Jimmy Ray?" is a song by English singer Jimmy Ray. It was released in October 1997 as the first single from his self-titled debut album (1997). The song peaked at number 13 on both the US Billboard Hot 100 and the UK Singles Chart. It was most successful in Canada, reaching number two on the RPM Top Singles chart. It has been Jimmy Ray's most popular single to date. Ray later re-recorded this song as "Who Wants to Know" on his second album, Live to Fight Another Day, in 2017.

Critical reception
AllMusic editor Stephen Thomas Erlewine declared the song as "infectious". Larry Flick from Billboard viewed it as a "quirky pop ditty". He noted that "the question now is, Will it grow into a full-fledged pop fire, à la Chumbawamba's similarly chantable breakout smash "Tubthumping"? Chances are certainly in its favor. The track has a fun, galloping beat, as well as scratchy guitars that are mildly reminiscent of '80s-era new wave. Who cares that the song does not appear to be about anything in particular? The words are cute if completely innocuous, and the chorus is as sticky as cotton candy." Tom Lanham from Entertainment Weekly wrote that Ray "gleefully pairs techno rhythms with a Sun-session slap back and chirpy female chorus."

Jerry Crowe of Los Angeles Times described it as "catchy", noting the song's "infectious" chorus; "Are you Johnnie Ray? Are you Stingray? Are you Fay Wray? Are you Jimmy Ray?" Pan-European magazine Music & Media constated that "he certainly is Jimmy Ray, and this sparkling, rocky, track is guaranteed to ensure that radio programmers across Europe won't forget this lanky London lad's name in a hurry. Ray's a new face, but there's a degree of familiarity about the music here; it owes much of its clout to a reworked Bo Diddley guitar riff." Music Week rated it five out of five, commenting that "pouting Jimmy looks the part of a popstar, and this self-penned song with well-thought out remixes should catapult him to stardom." A reviewer from People Magazine felt that the singer "exudes the sort of animal magnetism that has been a pop rarity lately."

Music video
A music video went into heavy rotation on music television. The video juxtaposed Ray's rockabilly image with a trailer park setting as women in sports jerseys and football shorts danced behind him. It was directed by British director Vaughan Arnell. The video was filmed in Los Angeles and in some of the scenes, Ray can be seen walking in front of the downtown LA skyline.

Track listing
 "Are You Jimmy Ray?" (radio edit) – 3:29 (Sax: Gary Barnacle)
 "Are You Jimmy Ray?" (Jimcon Extended Mix) – 6:10
 "Are You Jimmy Ray?" (Xenomania Club Mix) – 6:45

Charts

Weekly charts

Year-end charts

Certifications

|}

In popular culture
"Are You Jimmy Ray?" was featured in an episode of the American teen sitcom Clueless and was also featured in an episode of the MTV animated series, Daria. The song was also featured in the background of a 1998 episode of the daytime soap opera All My Children.

References

External links

1997 debut singles
1997 songs
Epic Records singles
S2 Records singles
Music videos directed by Vaughan Arnell
Jimmy Ray songs
Songs written by Jimmy Ray